What's the Point?!! is the fourth studio album by DIY home recording pioneer and one-man band R. Stevie Moore. It was the first album released by Steve Feigenbaum's Cuneiform Records label in Silver Spring MD. The vinyl record was pressed in the Netherlands. Never officially reissued on compact disc, the expanded & remastered CD-R version is available by mail from the artist.

Track listing

Side one
 GET THE JOB DONE (4:40) 
 LOVE HAS DOUBT (3:15) 
 THEME FROM HURRICANE DAVID (4:18) 
 PART OF THE PROBLEM (3:49) 
 COMPATIBILITY LEAVES (3:36) 
 GOING DOWN THE WAY (2:07) 
 FOR VINI (3:18)

Side two
 PUTTIN' UP THE GROCERIES (3:01) 
 CONFLICT OF INTEREST (2:46)
 I DON'T THINK SHE KNOWS (1:29) 
 BLOODY KNUCKLES (3:44) 
 WHERE YOU RESIDE (1:56) 
 I WANNA SLEEP (3:08) 
 WORLD'S FAIR (2:33) 
 TOO OLD (TO FALL IN LOVE) (3:07)

CDR Bonus Tracks: 
 COMMENTARY (1:01) 
 WHAT'S THE POINT (2:51) 
 PART OF THE PROBLEM (INST) (3:39) 
 I DON'T THINK SHE KNOWS (VCL) (1:00) 
 WICZ RADIO 1 (5:36) 
 BLOODY KNUCKLES (INST) (4:21) 
 WICZ RADIO 2 (6:22)

References

External links
 RSM's WTP webpage

Cuneiform Records albums
R. Stevie Moore albums
1984 albums
New Weird America albums